Fork Union is an unincorporated community in southern Fluvanna County, Virginia, along U.S. Highway 15. Its ZIP code is 23055; the population within that ZIP code was 1148 according to the 2000 Census. It is known mainly as the home of Fork Union Military Academy, Fork Union Animal Clinic and formerly had one of the few surviving drive-in theatres in Virginia (1.5 miles south of town in an area known as Weber City).  Fork Union is also home to a post office, a bank, a small grocery store, an IGA, and a Dollar General. The town also includes two independently owned restaurants: Sal's Pizza and The Village Restaurant. The Village of Fork Union is the location of Fluvanna County's only Presbyterian congregation, Fork Union Presbyterian Church. The James River is just a few miles from Fork Union.

Melrose and Western View are listed on the National Register of Historic Places.

References

Unincorporated communities in Fluvanna County, Virginia
Unincorporated communities in Virginia